In general relativity, a white hole is a hypothetical region of spacetime and singularity that cannot be entered from the outside, although energy-matter, light and information can escape from it. In this sense, it is the reverse of a black hole, which can be entered only from the outside and from which energy-matter, light and information cannot escape. White holes appear in the theory of eternal black holes. In addition to a black hole region in the future, such a solution of the Einstein field equations has a white hole region in its past. This region does not exist for black holes that have formed through gravitational collapse, however, nor are there any observed physical processes through which a white hole could be formed.

Supermassive black holes (SMBHs) are theoretically predicted to be at the center of every galaxy and that possibly, a galaxy cannot form without one. Stephen Hawking and others have proposed that these supermassive black holes spawn a supermassive white hole.

Overview
Like black holes, white holes have properties like mass, charge, and angular momentum. They attract matter like any other mass, but objects falling towards a white hole would never actually reach the white hole's event horizon (though in the case of the maximally extended Schwarzschild solution, discussed below, the white hole event horizon in the past becomes a black hole event horizon in the future, so any object falling towards it will eventually reach the black hole horizon).
Imagine a gravitational field, without a surface. Acceleration due to gravity is the greatest on the surface of any body. But since black holes lack a surface, acceleration due to gravity increases exponentially, but never reaches a final value as there is no considered surface in a singularity.

In quantum mechanics, the black hole emits Hawking radiation and so it can come to thermal equilibrium with a gas of radiation (not compulsory). Because a thermal-equilibrium state is time-reversal-invariant, Stephen Hawking argued that the time reversal of a black hole in thermal equilibrium results in a white hole in thermal equilibrium (each absorbing and emitting energy to equivalent degrees). Consequently, this may imply that black holes and white holes are reciprocal in structure, wherein the Hawking radiation from an ordinary black hole is identified with a white hole's emission of energy and matter. Hawking's semi-classical argument is reproduced in a quantum mechanical AdS/CFT treatment, where a black hole in anti-de Sitter space is described by a thermal gas in a gauge theory, whose time reversal is the same as itself.

Origin

The possibility of the existence of white holes was put forward by Russian cosmologist Igor Novikov in 1964. White holes are predicted as part of a solution to the Einstein field equations known as the maximally extended version of the Schwarzschild metric describing an eternal black hole with no charge and no rotation. Here, "maximally extended" refers to the idea that the spacetime should not have any "edges": for any possible trajectory of a free-falling particle (following a geodesic) in the spacetime, it should be possible to continue this path arbitrarily far into the particle's future, unless the trajectory hits a gravitational singularity like the one at the center of the black hole's interior. In order to satisfy this requirement, it turns out that in addition to the black hole interior region that particles enter when they fall through the event horizon from the outside, there must be a separate white hole interior region, which allows us to extrapolate the trajectories of particles that an outside observer sees rising up away from the event horizon. For an observer outside using Schwarzschild coordinates, infalling particles take an infinite time to reach the black hole horizon infinitely far in the future, while outgoing particles that pass the observer have been traveling outward for an infinite time since crossing the white hole horizon infinitely far in the past (however, the particles or other objects experience only a finite proper time between crossing the horizon and passing the outside observer). The black hole/white hole appears "eternal" from the perspective of an outside observer, in the sense that particles traveling outward from the white hole interior region can pass the observer at any time, and particles traveling inward, which will eventually reach the black hole interior region can also pass the observer at any time.

Just as there are two separate interior regions of the maximally extended spacetime, there are also two separate exterior regions, sometimes called two different "universes", with the second universe allowing us to extrapolate some possible particle trajectories in the two interior regions. This means that the interior black-hole region can contain a mix of particles that fell in from either universe (and thus an observer who fell in from one universe might be able to see light that fell in from the other one), and likewise particles from the interior white-hole region can escape into either universe. All four regions can be seen in a spacetime diagram that uses Kruskal–Szekeres coordinates (see figure).

In this spacetime, it is possible to come up with coordinate systems such that if you pick a hypersurface of constant time (a set of points that all have the same time coordinate, such that every point on the surface has a space-like separation, giving what is called a 'space-like surface') and draw an "embedding diagram" depicting the curvature of space at that time, the embedding diagram will look like a tube connecting the two exterior regions, known as an "Einstein-Rosen bridge" or Schwarzschild wormhole. Depending on where the space-like hypersurface is chosen, the Einstein-Rosen bridge can either connect two black hole event horizons in each universe (with points in the interior of the bridge being part of the black hole region of the spacetime), or two white hole event horizons in each universe (with points in the interior of the bridge being part of the white hole region). It is impossible to use the bridge to cross from one universe to the other, however, because it is impossible to enter a white hole event horizon from the outside, and anyone entering a black hole horizon from either universe will inevitably hit the black hole singularity.

Note that the maximally extended Schwarzschild metric describes an idealized black hole/white hole that exists eternally from the perspective of external observers; a more realistic black hole that forms at some particular time from a collapsing star would require a different metric. When the infalling stellar matter is added to a diagram of a black hole's history, it removes the part of the diagram corresponding to the white hole interior region. But because the equations of general relativity are time-reversible – they exhibit Time reversal symmetry – general relativity must also allow the time-reverse of this type of "realistic" black hole that forms from collapsing matter. The time-reversed case would be a white hole that has existed since the beginning of the universe, and that emits matter until it finally "explodes" and disappears. Despite the fact that such objects are permitted theoretically, they are not taken as seriously as black holes by physicists, since there would be no processes that would naturally lead to their formation; they could exist only if they were built into the initial conditions of the Big Bang. Additionally, it is predicted that such a white hole would be highly "unstable" in the sense that if any small amount of matter fell towards the horizon from the outside, this would prevent the white hole's explosion as seen by distant observers, with the matter emitted from the singularity never able to escape the white hole's gravitational radius.

Big Bang/Supermassive White Hole 

A view of black holes first proposed in the late 1980s might be interpreted as shedding some light on the nature of classical white holes. Some researchers have proposed that when a black hole forms, a Big Bang may occur at the core/singularity, which would create a new universe that expands outside of the parent universe. See also Fecund universes.

The Einstein–Cartan–Sciama–Kibble theory of gravity extends general relativity by removing a constraint of the symmetry of the affine connection and regarding its antisymmetric part, the torsion tensor, as a dynamical variable. Torsion naturally accounts for the quantum-mechanical, intrinsic angular momentum (spin) of matter.

According to general relativity, the gravitational collapse of a sufficiently compact mass forms a singular black hole. In the Einstein–Cartan theory, however, the minimal coupling between torsion and Dirac spinors generates a repulsive spin–spin interaction that is significant in fermionic matter at extremely high densities. Such an interaction prevents the formation of a gravitational singularity. Instead, the collapsing matter on the other side of the event horizon reaches an enormous but finite density and rebounds, forming a regular Einstein–Rosen bridge. The other side of the bridge becomes a new, growing baby universe. For observers in the baby universe, the parent universe appears as the only white hole. Accordingly, the observable universe is the Einstein–Rosen interior of a black hole existing as one of possibly many inside a larger universe. The Big Bang was a nonsingular Big Bounce at which the observable universe had a finite, minimum scale factor.

A 2012 paper argues that the Big Bang itself is a white hole. It further suggests that the emergence of a white hole, which was named a "Small Bang", is spontaneous—all the matter is ejected at a single pulse. Thus, unlike black holes, white holes cannot be continuously observed; rather, their effects can be detected only around the event itself. The paper even proposed identifying a new group of gamma-ray bursts with white holes.

But many scientists argue that universe is not formed by an ejection of matter by a white hole as the theory suggests that the matter in a white hole cannot  enter from outside. 

In 2014, the idea of the Big Bang being produced by a supermassive white hole explosion was explored in the framework of a five-dimensional vacuum by Madriz Aguilar, Moreno and Bellini.

See also

 Arrow of time
 Big Bounce
 Black hole
 Black hole cosmology
 Conformal cyclic cosmology
 Dark matter
 Exotic matter
 Naked singularity
 Negative mass
 Planck star
 Quantum mechanics
 Spacetime
 Star
 Wormhole

References

External links

 Embedding of the inverted Schwarzschild Solution 2d plot White hole in Google
 Schwarzschild Wormholes 
 Schwarzschild Wormhole animation 
 Shockwave cosmology inside a Black Hole
 Michio Kaku: Mr Parallel Universe
 End of Black Hole Is Starting of Big Bang – Discussed in Newsgroup in 1999
 Forward to the Future 1:Trapped in Time! 
 Forward to the Future 2:Back to the Past, with Interest... 

Black holes
Concepts in astronomy
General relativity
Hypothetical astronomical objects